Around the World in 80 Treasures is a 10-episode art and travel documentary series by the BBC, presented by Dan Cruickshank, and originally aired in February, March, and April 2005. The title is a reference to Around the World in Eighty Days, the classic adventure novel by Jules Verne.

In this series, Cruickshank takes a five-month world tour visiting his choices of the eighty greatest man-made treasures, including buildings and artifacts. His tour takes him through 34 countries and 6 of the 7 continents (he does not visit Antarctica). He did not visit Iraq due to the dangerous state of the country at the time.

In addition to seeing some of the world's greatest treasures, Cruickshank tries many different kinds of food including testicle, brain, and insects. His means of transportation included airplanes, trains, camel, donkey, foot, hot air balloon, bicycle, scooter, Volkswagen Beetle, hang glider, and boats.

A tie-in book of the same title was also published, written as a journal during the trip and containing much behind-the-scenes detail on the making of the programme in addition to Cruikshank's reflections on the treasures themselves.

Cruickshank's fondness of architecture is evident, with many of his chosen treasures being buildings or other man-made structures.

The official BBC DVD of the series was released on 19 May 2008. Licenses for DVD releases have been sold to many countries around the world.

The UKTV channel Eden frequently repeats the series.  However episodes are edited down to 46 minutes, to allow for adverts to be shown in the one-hour time slot.

Episode 1: Peru to Brazil

Episode 2: Mexico to Central North America

Episode 3: Australia to Cambodia

Episode 4: Japan to China

Episode 5: India to Sri Lanka

Episode 6: Uzbekistan to Syria

Episode 7: Jordan to Ethiopia

Cruickshank also visits Mount Nebo (Jordan) in this episode.

Episode 8: Mali to Egypt

Episode 9: Turkey to Germany

Episode 10: Bosnia to France and Home

Companion book

See also

References

External links

2005 British television series debuts
2005 British television series endings
2000s British documentary television series
BBC television documentaries about history
Documentary films about the visual arts
British travel television series
English-language television shows
Adventure travel